Progress M-11M, identified by NASA as Progress 43P, is a Progress spacecraft which was launched on 21 June 2011 to resupply the International Space Station. It was the eleventh Progress-M 11F615A60 spacecraft to be launched. The spacecraft is manufactured by RKK Energia, and will be operated by the Russian Federal Space Agency. Progress M-11M transferred more than 2500 kg of cargo to the Space Station, including food, water, scientific hardware, propellant, and cargo for the Russian Federal Space Agency (Roscosmos), NASA and the Japanese Space Agency, (JAXA).

Launch

The Soyuz-U rocket that carried the Progress M-11M cargo spacecraft into orbit was rolled out on 19 June 2011. Following the roll out, the rocket was erected in vertical in Baikonur's pad 1. L-2 days, operations were successfully completed on the day with integrated tests that included verification of the launch facilities and simulation of the lift-off and initial stages of the launch sequence.

The Progress M-11M was lifted off atop a Soyuz-U rocket from the Baikonur Space Center in Kazakhstan. After the launch, the spacecraft reached a preliminary orbit of 240.09 km by 193.96 km. The revolution of the successfully injected orbit was 88.54 minutes. A series of engine firings over the next two days guided the ship to set up a rendezvous with the Space Station.

Docking
Progress M-11M docked with the Zvezda service module of the Space Station at 16:37 UTC on 23 June 2011. The docking occurred 394 km above eastern Kazakhstan and under monitoring of the mission control center and the station crew after Progress ship approached the station on auto pilot. The docking was monitored by the Mission Control Center in Moscow and the station Expedition 28 crew.

Cargo
The cargo of Progress M-11M included 1276 kg of equipment, food, clothing, life support system gear, 740 kg of propellant, 420 kg of water and some 50 kg of oxygen and air.

Inventory
Total cargo mass delivered: 2673 kg

Station reboost
The four attitude thrusters of Progress M-11M was fired on 1 July 2011 to reboost the Space Station. After the burn, the ISS orbit was raised by 3.5 km and achieved 388.3 km. The purpose of the reboost was to gain altitude and set up phasing conditions for Space Shuttle Atlantis' STS-135 (ULF7) mission.

Undocking and deorbit

References

Spacecraft launched in 2011
Progress (spacecraft) missions
Spacecraft which reentered in 2011
Spacecraft launched by Soyuz-U rockets
Supply vehicles for the International Space Station